Joseph Fontanet (9 February 1921, Frontenex, Savoie – 2 February 1980, Paris) was a French politician.

He was first elected to Parliament in 1956 as MP for Savoie. In his 17 years in Parliament he held various cabinet positions including Health, Labour and Employment, and trade and industry. On 1 February 1980 he was shot shortly after midnight, and died the following day. No one has ever been convicted for the murder.

References

1921 births
1980 deaths
People from Savoie
Politicians from Auvergne-Rhône-Alpes
Popular Republican Movement politicians
Centre Democracy and Progress politicians
French Ministers of National Education
French Ministers of Commerce and Industry
French Ministers of Health
French Ministers of Labour and Social Affairs
Deputies of the 3rd National Assembly of the French Fourth Republic
Deputies of the 1st National Assembly of the French Fifth Republic
Deputies of the 2nd National Assembly of the French Fifth Republic
Deputies of the 3rd National Assembly of the French Fifth Republic
Deputies of the 4th National Assembly of the French Fifth Republic
Deputies of the 5th National Assembly of the French Fifth Republic
Assassinated French politicians
Deaths by firearm in France
People murdered in Paris
1980s murders in Paris
1980 murders in France
Members of Parliament for Savoie
Unsolved murders in France